This page lists published welding codes, procedures, and specifications.

American Society of Mechanical Engineers (ASME) Codes 
The American Society of Mechanical Engineers (ASME) Boiler and Pressure Vessel Code (BPVC) covers all aspects of design and manufacture of boilers and pressure vessels. All sections contain welding specifications, however most relevant information is contained in the following:

American Welding Society (AWS) Standards
The American Welding Society (AWS) publishes over 240 AWS-developed codes, recommended practices and guides which are written in accordance with American National Standards Institute (ANSI) practices.   The following is a partial  list of the more common publications:

American Petroleum Institute (API) Standards
The American Petroleum Institute (API) oldest and most successful programs is in the development of API standards which started with its first standard in 1924.  API maintains over 500 standards covering the oil and gas field.  The following is a partial list specific to welding:

Australian / New Zealand (AS/NZS) Standards
Standards Australia is the body responsible for the development, maintenance and publication of Australian Standards.   The following is a partial list specific to welding:

Canadian Standards Association (CSA) Standards
The Canadian Standards Association (CSA) is responsible for the development, maintenance and publication of CSA standards.  The following is a partial list specific to welding:

British Standards (BS)
British Standards are developed, maintained and published by BSI Standards which is UK's National Standards Body.   The following is a partial list of standards specific to welding:

International Organization for Standardization (ISO) Standards
International Organization for Standardization (ISO) has developed over 18500 standards and over 1100 new standards are published every year.   The following is a partial list of the standards specific to welding:

European Union (CEN) standards 
The European Committee for Standardization (CEN) had issued numerous standards covering welding processes, which unified and replaced former national standards. Of the former national standards, those issued by BSI and DIN were widely used outside their countries of origin. After the Vienna Agreement with ISO, CEN has replaced most of them with equivalent ISO standards (EN ISO series). 

Additional requirements for welding exist in CEN codes and standards for specific products, like EN 12952, EN 12953, EN 13445, EN 13480, etc.

German Standards (DIN and others)
NA 092 is the Standards Committee for welding and allied processes (NAS) at DIN Deutsches Institut für Normung e. V.   The following is a partial list of DIN welding standards:

Japanese Standards (JIS and others)

Japanese Industrial Standards (JIS)

Japanese Industrial Standards are the standards used for industrial activities in Japan, coordinated by the Japanese Industrial Standards Committee (JISC) and published by the Japanese Standards Association (JSA). 
JIS Z 3001-1　Welding and allied processes-Vocabulary-Part 1: General
JIS Z 3001-2　Welding and allied processes-Vocabulary-Part 2: Welding processes
JIS Z 3001-3　Welding and allied processes-Vocabulary-Part 3: Soldering and brazing
JIS Z 3001-4　Welding and allied processes-Vocabulary-Part 4: Imperfections in welding
JIS Z 3001-5　Welding and allied processes-Vocabulary-Part 5: Laser welding
JIS Z 3001-6　Welding and allied processes-Vocabulary-Part 6: Resistance welding
JIS Z 3001-7　Welding and allied processes-Vocabulary-Part 7: Arc welding
JIS Z 3011　　Welding positions defined by means of angles of slope and rotation
JIS Z 3021　　Welding and allied processes -- Symbolic representation

Japan Welding Society Standard (WES)

As a WES standard, it is defined in the following classification.
 Fundamentals
 Tests, inspections and their equipment
 Base material
 welding material
 Welding and cutting equipment and accessories
 Welding design and construction
 Welding-related certifications and certifications
 Safety, health and environment

See also
 Welding
 List of welding processes
 Welder certification
 Welding Procedure Specification
 Welder

Notes

References 

Structural steel

Further reading and external links

 Overview poster of CEN & ISO welding standards

Welding codes
Codes